The Kirsha Training Centre is the training facility of the Ukrainian Premier League club Shakhtar Donetsk and its U-19 side, FC Shakhtar-3 Donetsk. Located in Donetsk, Ukraine, the training centre has been open since 1953. Since the centre's opening, upgrades have been made including a rehabilitation centre, gymnasium, canteen, consulting room, medical offices, and many other services.

Due to the Russo-Ukrainian War, the training center was damaged and Shakhtar recreated another training center near Kyiv as Sviatoshyn Training Center.

Development
Previous training facilities for the club had existed on the site since 1953. The new training centre was opened in 1999.

Facilities
In all, there are nine full-size pitches at the site. Eight are natural grass pitches, and one is made of artificial turf. All of the pitches are illuminated, and three have undersoil heating. The rehabilitation centre consists of medical offices, treatment rooms, a swimming pool, steamroom, gymnasium, IT room, cinema, indoor garden, and a conference hall. Facilities built for FC Shakhtar-3 Donetsk include a canteen, gymnasium, consulting room, dormitories, cinema, IT room, and billiard and table tennis tables.

References

External links 
 Official website

1953 establishments in Ukraine
Football venues in Donetsk Oblast
Kirsha
FC Shakhtar Donetsk
Sport in Donetsk
Buildings and structures in Donetsk
Sports venues in Donetsk Oblast